William Chaloner (fl. 1390s) was member of Parliament for Malmesbury for the parliament of 1393.

References 

Members of the Parliament of England for Malmesbury
English MPs 1393
Year of birth unknown
Year of death unknown